The Megalopodidae are a small family of leaf beetles, previously included as a subfamily within the Chrysomelidae. One of its constituent subfamilies, Zeugophorinae, has also frequently been treated as a subfamily within Chrysomelidae. The family contains approximately 30 genera worldwide, primarily in the nominate subfamily Megalopodinae, and mostly circumtropical.

The larvae of some species are leaf miners on various host plants. Other larvae feed on stem-tissue or pollen grains of conifer strobili. Once fully grown, the larvae drops to the ground and pupates.

References

 ;  1990: Palophaginae, a new subfamily for leaf-beetles, feeding as adult and larva on araucarian pollen in Australia (Coleoptera: Megalopodidae). Invertebrate taxonomy, 3: 697–719. 
  1802: Histoire naturelle, générale et particulière des Crustacés et des Insectes. Tome 3. F. Dufart, Paris. Internet Archive BHL
  (eds). 2010 Catalogue of Palearctic Coleoptera. Vol. 6:  Chrysomeloidea. Apollo Books, Stenstrup, Denmark, p. 334

External links
 Australian Faunal Directory
 Atlas of the family Megalopodidae of Russia

 
Beetle families